Launay is a township municipality in the Canadian province of Quebec, located in the Abitibi Regional County Municipality.

Demographics 

Population trend:
 Population in 2011: 229 (2006 to 2011 population change: 1.3%)
 Population in 2006: 226
 Population in 2001: 259
 Population in 1996: 260
 Population in 1991: 272

Mother tongue:
 English as first language: 0%
 French as first language: 95.6%
 English and French as first language: 0%
 Other as first language: 4.4%

Municipal council
 Mayor: Claude Lamoureux
 Councillors: Claude Audy, Gilles Labbé, Éloi Lambert, André Morin, Fernande Sylvain, Carmelle Veillette

References

Township municipalities in Quebec
Incorporated places in Abitibi-Témiscamingue